Vladimír Pončák (born 19 June 1982) is a Slovak former football defender who last played for the II. liga club ŠTK 1914 Šamorín. He played 100 times in the Gambrinus liga, the top football league in the Czech Republic.

References

External links

at fcpetrzalka1898.sk

1982 births
Living people
Slovak footballers
Association football defenders
1. FC Tatran Prešov players
FK Inter Bratislava players
SK Dynamo České Budějovice players
FK Jablonec players
SK Kladno players
FC Spartak Trnava players
FC Petržalka players
FC ŠTK 1914 Šamorín players
Slovak Super Liga players
Czech First League players
Footballers from Bratislava
2. Liga (Slovakia) players